Leonor Kretzer Sullivan (August 21, 1902 – September 1, 1988) was a member of the United States House of Representatives from Missouri.  She was a Democrat and the first woman in Congress from Missouri.

Biography
Born Leonor Kretzer in St. Louis, Missouri, three of her grandparents were German immigrants. Sullivan attended Washington University in St. Louis and was a teacher and director at St. Louis Comptometer school.  She was married to John B. Sullivan, who served four terms in Congress, and she served as his administrative aide.  Following her husband's death in 1951, she served as an aide to Congressman Leonard Irving until she left to run for Congress herself in 1952.  She was re-elected eleven times.  In Congress, she served for many years as Secretary of the House Democratic Caucus.

Sullivan helped create the food stamp program, which was opposed by Agriculture Secretary Ezra Taft Benson and became law in the 1960s during the Kennedy and Johnson administrations.

Sullivan did not sign the 1956 Southern Manifesto, and voted in favor of the Civil Rights Acts of 1957, 1960, 1964, and 1968, as well as the 24th Amendment to the U.S. Constitution and the Voting Rights Act of 1965.

Sullivan was one of very few members of Congress, and the only woman member of Congress, to vote against the Equal Rights Amendment for women in the early 1970s.

She did not seek re-election in 1976, and was succeeded by Dick Gephardt.

In 1979, the Supersisters trading card set was produced and distributed; one of the cards featured Sullivan's name and picture.

The former Wharf Street in front of the Gateway Arch in Downtown St. Louis was renamed Leonor K. Sullivan Boulevard in her honor.

Quotes
"A woman with a woman's viewpoint is of more value when she forgets she's a woman and begins to act like a man."

See also
 Women in the United States House of Representatives

References

External links

|-

|-

|-

|-

1902 births
1988 deaths
20th-century American politicians
20th-century American women politicians
American people of German descent
Democratic Party members of the United States House of Representatives from Missouri
Female members of the United States House of Representatives
Politicians from St. Louis
Washington University in St. Louis alumni
Women in Missouri politics